Operation Viper is the name of a United States military campaign in Baghran District, Helmand Province, Afghanistan, started on 10 February 2003. The goal of Operation Viper was for the U.S. to search  villages and recover weapons caches and other war material left by Taliban and Al-Qaida forces.

An operation against illegal firearms and ammunition by the Metropolitan Police of London, England started in 2016 and continuing  also has the name "Operation Viper".

References

Viper
War in Afghanistan (2001–2021)